Army Public School is a higher-secondary co-education government school in the Patiala city of Punjab, India. The school was founded in 1985 and is affiliated to the Central Board of Secondary Education since 2013.

References 

Indian Army Public Schools
Co-educational schools in India
High schools and secondary schools in Patiala
Educational institutions established in 1985
1985 establishments in Punjab, India